Caloplaca albovariegata, the variegated orange lichen, is a gray, blue-gray, or dark green crustose areolate lichen that grows on rocks in areas of western North America such as Arizona and California. It is common in the Mojave Desert. It has no prothallus. It is in the genus Caloplaca in the family Teloschistaceae. It is similar to Caloplaca peliophylla, which has lighter brown apothecial discs and a narrower spore isthmus.

See also
List of Caloplaca species

References

albovariegata
Lichen species
Lichens of the Southwestern United States
Lichens described in 1942
Taxa named by Maurice Bouly de Lesdain
Fungi without expected TNC conservation status